Wilson Thomas (born October 21, 1979) is a former American football wide receiver in the Arena Football League who played for the Arizona Rattlers. He played college football for the Nebraska Cornhuskers.

He also played for the Nebraska Cornhuskers basketball team.

References

1979 births
Living people
American football wide receivers
Arizona Rattlers players
Nebraska Cornhuskers football players
Nebraska Cornhuskers men's basketball players
American men's basketball players